Ponginae , also known as the Asian hominids, is a subfamily in the family Hominidae. Once a diverse lineage of Eurasian apes, the subfamily has only one extant genus, Pongo (orangutans), which contains three extant species; the Sumatran orangutan (Pongo abelii), the Tapanuli orangutan (Pongo tapanuliensis) and the Bornean orangutan (Pongo pygmaeus). All three species are listed as critically endangered by the International Union for Conservation of Nature (IUCN).

Evolutionary history
The first pongine genera appear in the Miocene, Sivapithecus and Khoratpithecus, six or seven million years before evidence of orangutans was found from Pleistocene southeast Asia and southern China. Ponginae may also include the genera Lufengpithecus, Ankarapithecus, and Gigantopithecus. However, phylogenetic analysis in 2004, which originally found Lufengpithecus and Ankarapithecus to be most closely related to the orangutan, gave different results "under an analytical method that attempted to reduce stratigraphic incongruence", instead placing them on the base of the stem of the African ape-human clade. 

Meganthropus was considered by the majority of paleoanthropologists as falling within the variation of Homo erectus. However, a study from 2019 of tooth morphology found Meganthropus a valid genus of non-hominin hominid ape, most closely related to Lufengpithecus

The most well-known fossil genus of Ponginae is Sivapithecus, consisting of several species from 12.5 million to 8.5 million years ago. It differs from orangutans in dentition and postcranial morphology.

Taxonomy
Ponginae
 †Lufengpithecini
 †Lufengpithecus
 Lufengpithecus lufengensis
 Lufengpithecus keiyuanensis
 Lufengpithecus hudienensis
 †Meganthropus
 Meganthropus palaeojavanicus
 †Sivapithecini
 †Ankarapithecus
 Ankarapithecus meteai
 †Sivapithecus
 Sivapithecus brevirostris
 Sivapithecus punjabicus
 Sivapithecus parvada
 Sivapithecus sivalensis
 Sivapithecus indicus
 †Gigantopithecus
 Gigantopithecus bilaspurensis
 Gigantopithecus blacki
 †Indopithecus
 Indopithecus giganteus
 Pongini
 †Khoratpithecus
 Khoratpithecus ayeyarwadyensis
 Khoratpithecus piriyai
 Khoratpithecus chiangmuanensis
 Pongo (orangutans)
 †Pongo hooijeri
 †Pongo weidenreichi
 Sumatran orangutan, Pongo abelii
 Bornean orangutan, Pongo pygmaeus
 Tapanuli orangutan, Pongo tapanuliensis

References

Apes
Mammal subfamilies
Taxa named by Daniel Giraud Elliot
Taxa described in 1913